Mesothrips is a genus of thrips in the family Phlaeothripidae.

Species
 Mesothrips acutus
 Mesothrips alluaudi
 Mesothrips ambasensis
 Mesothrips angusticollis
 Mesothrips annamensis
 Mesothrips apatelus
 Mesothrips armatus
 Mesothrips bhimabahu
 Mesothrips breviceps
 Mesothrips citritibiae
 Mesothrips claripennis
 Mesothrips constrictus
 Mesothrips cracens
 Mesothrips elaeocarpi
 Mesothrips extensivus
 Mesothrips fulmeki
 Mesothrips guamensis
 Mesothrips ignotus
 Mesothrips jasmini
 Mesothrips jordani
 Mesothrips latifolii
 Mesothrips latus
 Mesothrips leeuweni
 Mesothrips lividicornis
 Mesothrips longisetis
 Mesothrips malloti
 Mesothrips manii
 Mesothrips melinocnemis
 Mesothrips memecylonicus
 Mesothrips mendax
 Mesothrips moundi
 Mesothrips orientalis
 Mesothrips parvus
 Mesothrips perlucidus
 Mesothrips picticornis
 Mesothrips pyctes
 Mesothrips schouteniae
 Mesothrips sus
 Mesothrips swezeyi
 Mesothrips ustulatus
 Mesothrips vitis
 Mesothrips vitripennis

References

Phlaeothripidae
Thrips
Thrips genera